Captain Atlas (Att-Lass) is a fictional character appearing in American comic books published by Marvel Comics. Created by writer Mark Gruenwald and artist Mike Manley, the character debuted in Quasar #9 (April 1990). He was introduced as the partner of Doctor Minerva and later he was a member of the Kree superteam Starforce. He was also known as Titanium Man.

The character was portrayed by Algenis Perez Soto in the Marvel Cinematic Universe film Captain Marvel (2019).

Publication history
Captain Atlas first appeared in Quasar #9 (April 1990), created by writer Mark Gruenwald and artist Mike Manley. He was introduced as the new lover of Doctor Minerva, she had empowered herself and At-lass.

He reappeared as a member of the Starforce team; alongside Minerva, Ronan the Accuser, Supremor, Ultimus, Korath the Pursuer and Shatterax, created by the Supreme Intelligence. The team was active during the Operation Galactic Storm, tasked with defending the Kree empire from superpowered threats.

He had a new code name called Titanium Man.

Fictional character biography
Att-Lass, a native of the planet Kree-Lar, throne-world of the Kree empire, graduates from the Kree Military Academy to become a Captain in the Kree space fleet. He is given command of the Kree light cruiser Ramatam. He also becomes a warrior and special operative for the Supreme Intelligence.

Taking the alias Mr. Atlas, he accompanies Doctor Minerva to an A.I.M. Weapons Exposition. He helps Minerva capture Quasar to obtain his quantum bands. He is later rescued from outer space by Quasar, but the hero forces him to leave Earth.

Captain Atlas and Doctor Minerva then explore Captain Marvel's tomb on one of Saturn's moons, looking for his nega-bands. Atlas is captured by Quasar again and attacked by Shi'ar Imperial Guard members, representatives of a galaxy spanning avian race. Atlas still manages to obtain Mar-Vell's nega-bands. Atlas then battles Wonder Man on Earth, and is captured by him. He is freed by a member of the Guard posing as Doctor Minerva, then captured by the rest of the Imperial Guard. The Shi'ar then strip him of the nega-bands, and telepathic Guard member Oracle drains Atlas of strategic information. Atlas is then freed from Shi'ar captivity by Shatterax.

Atlas then joins the Kree Starforce. Alongside the Starforce, he fights against the Avengers on Kree-Lar. He survives the genocidal 'Nega-Bomb', which nearly wipes out Kree society. He then apparently commits suicide through the activation of his battle-suit's self-destruct program, but actually survives and goes into hiding with Doctor Minerva.

During the Infinity storyline, the Kree send Captain Atlas down to Earth where he poses as Titanium Man and gathers Blizzard, Constrictor, Firebrand IV, Spymaster, Unicorn, Whiplash IV, and Whirlwind to join him in a heist upon Stark Tower to steal the Iron Man armors there. After a quick skirmish, Captain Atlas would announce that he knew where to find the buyer for the stolen Iron Man armors and teleported his "teammates" back to his ship where he revealed his true identity. Iron Man eventually tracked down the villains and helped Blizzard, Constrictor, Firebrand, Unicorn, Whiplash, and Whirlwind fight Captain Atlas and Spymaster upon the two double-crossing the other villains. Before Captain Atlas can crush Iron Man to death, he is vaporized by Unicorn.

Powers and abilities

Att-Lass was a member of the alien Kree race, and was also mutagenically altered by the Kree Psyche-Magnetron, giving him superhuman strength and durability and the power of flight. He could not breathe in Earth's atmosphere without a special apparatus or breathing serum.

Att-Lass was one of the Kree Empire's most decorated soldiers, and highly accomplished in all forms of armed and unarmed combat utilized in the Kree Empire. He was an excellent hand-to-hand combatant. He also had the ability to pilot various Kree starships.

The craftsmen and technicians of the Kree Empire constructed a number of accessories for his use as an officer of the Kree military. His helmet contains a supply of air with the same nitrogen-oxygen balance as Kree-Lar's atmosphere. Alternatively, he can employ a special serum to allow him to breathe Earth'd atmosphere without his helmet; the serum also temporarily alters his skin color to a Caucasian tone. The Kree uni-beam he wears on his wrist projects concussive energy beams and laser like-light beams generating intense heat.  He was the captain of the Ramatam, and had access to the advanced technology and armament aboard the starship.

He briefly wore Captain Marvel's nega-bands, which enabled him to convert psionic energy for a variety of uses, including enhancing his already superhuman strength and durability.

Other versions

Marvel Zombies
In Marvel Zombies, a zombie version of Captain Atlas is seen along with other zombified heroes trying to capture Magneto and his group of survivors.

House of M
In the House of M reality, a version of Captain Atlas as a captain of the Kree army is featured.

What If?
A version of Captain Atlas is featured in What If? Avengers lost Kree-Shi'ar war.

Mini-Marvels
A version of Captain Atlas appears in Mini Marvels.

In other media
 Att-Lass appears in the live-action Marvel Cinematic Universe film Captain Marvel, portrayed by Algenis Perez Soto. This version is a member of Yon-Rogg's Starforce equipped with twin pistols. Att-Lass accompanies Yon-Rogg, Starforce, and a group of Kree soldiers to Earth to find Carol Danvers, who had discovered the truth of the Kree's war with the Skrulls. He is initially reluctant to bring Danvers in, but after she unlocks her powers' full potential, Att-Lass joins Starforce in attacking her, only to be subdued.
 Att-Lass appears as a supporting character in the video game Avengers in Galactic Storm.

References

External links
 Captain Atlas at Marvel.com

Characters created by Mark Gruenwald
Comics characters introduced in 1990
Kree
Marvel Comics aliens
Marvel Comics characters with superhuman strength
Marvel Comics male supervillains
Marvel Comics supervillains